William Fred DeLay (January 17, 1901 – September 25, 1969) was an American football and basketball coach and college athletics administrator.  He served as the head football coach at Union University in Jackson, Tennessee from 1937 to 1942 and again in 1948.  DeLay was also the athletic director at Union from  1937 to 1945 and 1948 to 1949.

DeLay was born and raised in Lascassas, Tennessee.  He played college football and college baseball at Middle Tennessee State Normal School—now known as Middle Tennessee State University and earned a master's degree at Peabody College.  He died at the age of 68, on September 25, 1969, at Parkview Hospital in Nashville, Tennessee.

Head coaching record

Football

References

1901 births
1969 deaths
Middle Tennessee Blue Raiders baseball players
Middle Tennessee Blue Raiders football players
Union Bulldogs athletic directors
Union Bulldogs football coaches
Union Bulldogs men's basketball coaches
High school basketball coaches in Tennessee
High school football coaches in Tennessee
Peabody College alumni
People from Rutherford County, Tennessee
Players of American football from Tennessee
Baseball players from Tennessee
Basketball coaches from Tennessee